Adelaide Parklands Terminal, formerly known as Keswick Terminal,  is the interstate passenger railway station in Adelaide, South Australia. It is the only station in the world where passengers can board trains on both north-south and east-west transcontinental routes.

The terminal is north of the suburb of Keswick,  by road south-west of the city centre, and adjoins the south-western sector of the West Parklands.

History
The terminal opened on 18 May 1984 as Keswick Terminal (and located near, but not connected to, the now demolished Keswick station). It was developed by Australian National (AN) as a dedicated long-haul passenger rail station, allowing AN to vacate the then State Transport Authority's Adelaide railway station. It was included in the sale of Australian National's passenger operations to Great Southern Rail in 1997.

In June 2008, the station was renamed Adelaide Parklands Terminal following Stage One of a plan to "improve guest comfort and amenity, traffic and passenger movement, food and retail facilities, image, identity, presentation and sustainability".

Services
It was also served by regional trains until all passenger trains outside the Adelaide conurbation had ceased operation by 1990. In 2020 a new passenger train service, the Great Southern to Brisbane, also operated from the terminal. , these trains were operated by Journey Beyond.

Visiting passenger trains from interstate also visit the terminal, albeit rarely.

Local transport

Gallery

References

External links

Flick gallery

Railway stations in Adelaide
Railway stations in Australia opened in 1984